Steplag or Stepnoy Camp Directorate, Special Camp No. 4  (Степлаг (Степной лагерь), Особлаг (Особый лагерь) № 4) was an MVD special camp for political prisoners within the Gulag system of the Soviet Union. It was established on February 28, 1948, on the base of the Jezkazgan POW camp, Kazakhstan, with the headquarters at Kengir. In 1956, Steplag was disestablished, and its camps were transferred to Kazakh SSR.

In May-June 1954, the Kengir uprising of the inmates happened in Steplag.

References

MVD special camps